İrfan Şahinbaş Workshop Stage is a theatre in Yenimahalle district of Ankara, Turkey. It is operated by the Turkish State Theatres. The theatre is named in honor of İrfan Şahinbaş (1912–1990), an academic in English studies and History of theatre.

References

Theatres in Ankara
Yenimahalle, Ankara
Turkish State Theatres